Zack Morris may refer to:

 Zack Morris (Saved by the Bell), fictional character from the sitcoms Good Morning, Miss Bliss; Saved by the Bell; and Saved by the Bell: The College Years
 Zack Morris (actor), (born 1998), English actor

See also 
 Zac Morris, English cricketer